Kanemoto (written: 金元, 金本 or 兼本) is both a Japanese surname and a masculine Japanese given name. Notable people with the name include::

Surname:
Akio Kanemoto (born 1945), Japanese golfer
Erv Kanemoto (born 1943), American motorcycle mechanic
Hisako Kanemoto (born 1987), Japanese voice actress
Keita Kanemoto (born 1977), Japanese footballer
Koji Kanemoto (born 1966), Zainichi Korean Japanese professional wrestler
Masamitsu Kanemoto (born 1962), Japanese footballer
Shingo Kanemoto (1932–1991), Japanese voice actor
Takashi Kanemoto (born 1970), Japanese golfer
Tomoaki Kanemoto (born 1968), Japanese baseball player
Yoshinori Kanemoto (born 2000), member of the South Korean boy band Treasure

Given name:
Nijō Kanemoto (1268–1334), Japanese kugyō

Japanese-language surnames
Japanese masculine given names